Neverland Studios is an American recording studio in Nashville, Tennessee owned and operated by musician and songwriter Derri Daugherty. The studio is not connected to Michael Jackson's Neverland Ranch.

History
Neverland was originally built in Los Alamitos, California, but eventually settled in Nashville, Tennessee when Daugherty relocated there in the early 1990s. Daugherty's band The Choir has recorded nearly all of its albums at the studio, including Chase the Kangaroo, Wide Eyed Wonder, Circle Slide, Kissers and Killers, Speckled Bird, Free Flying Soul, the Grammy nominated Flap Your Wings and O How the Mighty Have Fallen.

Other albums to be recorded at the studio include the Lost Dogs albums Real Men Cry, Nazarene Crying Towel, MUTT, Island Dreams and The Lost Cabin and the Mystery Trees; parts of Daniel Amos' albums Kalhoun and MotorCycle; The Swirling Eddies' The midget, the speck and the molecule; The Drums for Mark Heard's Second Hand; Drums and Guitars for John Austin's The Embarrassing Young; Randy Stonehill's Wonderama, and Return to Paradise; the Various Artists series City on a Hill, and others.

Recording studios in Tennessee